Robin Cederberg (born 25 February 1983) is a Swedish footballer who plays for IFÖ Bromölla IF as a defender.

References

External links

1983 births
Living people
Association football defenders
Mjällby AIF players
Allsvenskan players
Superettan players
Swedish footballers
Notodden FK players